Aetna Township may refer to the following places in the United States:

Aetna Township, Logan County, Illinois
Aetna Township, Kansas
Aetna Township, Mecosta County, Michigan 
Aetna Township, Missaukee County, Michigan 
Aetna Township, Minnesota

Township name disambiguation pages